The New Blood was a professional wrestling stable in World Championship Wrestling (WCW) in 2000.

History 
In early 2000, WCW decided that Kevin Sullivan's booking style was not as successful as they had hoped. So, they decided to bring back former WCW president Eric Bischoff and former World Wrestling Federation (WWF) head of creative Vince Russo, putting them together to run WCW.

On-screen, Bischoff and Russo took over and declared all WCW titles vacant on April 10, 2000. They also declared a new stable with both of them at the helm called The New Blood. It consisted of most of the younger wrestlers in WCW as well as longtime talent that had been largely in the background for years, feuding with "The Millionaire's Club", the older stars of WCW, who they claimed held them all back. The idea was to get the younger talent over and generate more interest among the younger fans that watched the WWF instead of WCW, although it later evolved into a New World Order rehash. While Hulk Hogan feuded with the New Blood, he would occasionally wear a black denim vest, with the initials "F.U.N.B." on the back in white. The initials "F.U.N.B." stood for "Fuck U New Blood". During a televised promo, Hogan said "The N.B. stands for New Blood, and you can guess what the F.U. means, brother!".

On April 16, at Spring Stampede in Chicago, Illinois, all of the titles were filled with matches between the New Blood and the Millionaire's Club. The New Blood won all of the vacant WCW titles, with the exception of the WCW Hardcore Championship, which was won by Terry Funk.

The feuds continued for another month or so before the New Blood disbanded due to WCW management making a hasty decision that it was not working, as the Millionaire's Club got most of the positive fan reaction.

The true end of the angle occurred on July 9 at Bash at the Beach in Daytona Beach, Florida, after the infamous Russo shoot promo, which caused Hogan and Bischoff to leave the promotion. However, the New Blood theme continued in WCW coinciding with the New Blood Rising pay-per-view in August 2000.

Impact 
Diamond Dallas Page quit WCW (in storyline), citing his feud with Eric Bischoff and the New Blood cost him his health, the WCW World Championship, his wife Kimberly, half of his possessions via divorce, and his best friend Chris Kanyon.

Ric Flair's wrestling career was ended (in storyline) by Vince Russo and David Flair in a handicap match, with Flair's daughter Meghan throwing the towel in; Ric and son Reid had their heads shaved after the loss. In reality, Flair needed to have rotator cuff surgery.

Sting suffered major injuries (storyline) after being set on fire and tossed off the TurnerVision scaffolding by Vampiro.

Hollywood Hulk Hogan suffered injuries (storyline) after being put through a table by Bill Goldberg.  Hogan was later publicly fired from WCW by Vince Russo during an in-ring promo.

Jim Duggan suffered internal bleeding (storyline) and was stretchered out of the ring following Bill Goldberg targeting his kidney.

Members 
The New Blood was composed of 3 different "stables" within itself: The Filthy Animals, The Natural Born Thrillers, and the other New Blood. The New Blood members were the ones who mostly feuded with the Millionaire's Club, while the other two were more of supporting casts. The Natural Born Thrillers were all rookies (with the exception of Shawn Stasiak), while the rest of the New Blood had already had TV time.

 Wrestlers of The New Blood

 David Arquette
 Mike Awesome
 Buff Bagwell
 Bam Bam Bigelow
 Booker T
 Crowbar
 Disco Inferno/Disqo
 Shane Douglas
 David Flair
 Goldberg
 Juventud Guerrera
 Bret Hart
 Horace Hogan
 Mark Jindrak

 Johnny the Bull
 Chris Kanyon
 Billy Kidman
 Konnan
 Ernest Miller
 Rey Misterio, Jr.
 Sean O'Haire
 Chuck Palumbo
 Reno
 Mike Sanders
 Shawn Stasiak
 Lance Storm
 Vampiro
 Big Vito
 The Wall

 Leaders of The New Blood
 Eric Bischoff
 Vince Russo
 Jeff Jarrett
 Managers of The New Blood
 Tylene Buck
 Daffney
 Miss Hancock
 Kimberly Page
 Madusa
 Midajah
 M.I. Smooth (also a part-time wrestler for the group)
 Ron Reis (one night-only)
 Shakira (Kim Kanner)
 Tammy Lynn Sytch
 Torrie Wilson

Championships and accomplishments 
 World Championship Wrestling
 WCW World Heavyweight Championship (5 times) – Jeff Jarrett (4), David Arquette (1)
 WCW United States Heavyweight Championship (1 time) – Scott Steiner
 WCW Cruiserweight Championship (3 times) – Chris Candido (1), Crowbar (1), Daffney (1)
 WCW Hardcore Championship (5 times) – Shane Douglas (1), Eric Bischoff (1), Johnny the Bull (1), Big Vito (2)
 WCW World Tag Team Championship (2 times) – Shane Douglas and Buff Bagwell (1), Chuck Palumbo and Shawn Stasiak (1)

References

World Championship Wrestling teams and stables